The Moluccan bow-fingered gecko (Cyrtodactylus deveti) is a species of lizard in the family Gekkonidae. The species is endemic to the Moluccas in Indonesia.

Etymology
The specific name, deveti, is in honor of Dutch neurosurgeon Arnold C. De Vet (1904–2001).

Geographic range
C. deveti is found in the northern Moluccas, on the islands of Halmahera and Morotai.

Habitat

Reproduction
C. deveti is oviparous.

References

Further reading
Brongersma LD (1948). "Lizards from the Island of Morotai (Moluccas)". Proceedings of the Koninklijke Nederlandse Akademie van Wetenschappen, Series C. 51: 486–495. (Gymnodactylus deveti, new species, pp. 486–489, Figures 1a–1d).
Rösler H (2000). "Kommentierte Liste der rezent, subrezent und fossil bekannten Geckotaxa (Reptilia: Gekkonomorpha)". Gekkota 2: 2853. (Cyrtodactylus deveti, new combination, p. 65). (in German).

Cyrtodactylus
Reptiles described in 1948
Taxa named by Leo Brongersma